Michaela Morkan is a camogie player and student. She won a Camogie All Stars award in 2008 having been nominated in 2006, a Soaring Star award in 2009 and won a 2009 All Ireland junior camogie medal. She won All-Ireland 'B' titles with Offaly in Under-16 (2005) and Under-18 (2008), as well as three Senior championships with her club. Attended Borrisokane Community College where she was female sportsperson of the year in 2008. Also Tipperary V.E.C. sportsperson of the year in 2007 and winner of Munster schools titles in the Junior, Intermediate and Senior grades.

References

External links 
 Official Camogie Website
 Offaly Camogie website
  On The Ball Official Camogie Magazine
 Video Highlights of 2009 All Ireland Junior Final
 Report of Offaly v Waterford 2009 All Ireland junior final in Irish Times Independent, Examiner and Offaly Express.
 Video highlights of 2009 championship Part One and part two

1990 births
Living people
Offaly camogie players